Events in the year 2022 in Macau, China.

Incumbents 

 Chief Executive: Ho Iat Seng
 President of the Legislative Assembly: Kou Hoi In

Events 

 21 June – Authorities in Macau place a casino and hotel with more than 700 people inside under lockdown due to an outbreak of COVID-19 in the territory.
 11 July – Macau closes all of its casinos in order to contain an outbreak of COVID-19 in the city.
 17-20 November – 2022 Macau Grand Prix

Sports 

 2022 Liga de Elite

References 

 
Years of the 21st century in Macau
Macau
Macau
2020s in Macau